Peter Murray James, OBE (born 19 September 1925), known professionally as Pete Murray, is a British radio and television presenter and actor. He is known for his career with the BBC including stints on the Light Programme, Radio 1, Radio 2 and Radio 4. In the 1950s, Murray became one of Britain's first pop music television presenters, hosting the rock and roll programme Six-Five Special (1957–1958) and appearing as a regular panellist on Juke Box Jury (1959–1967). He was a recurring presence in the BBC's coverage of the Eurovision Song Contest. Murray returned to broadcasting for a Boom Radio special on Boxing Day 2021, over 70 years after his career began. He returned to the station on Boxing Day 2022 where he presented a two-hour show alongside his friend, David Hamilton.

Career
Murray first joined the English service of Radio Luxembourg in 1949 or 1950 as one of its resident announcers in the Grand Duchy, and remained there until 1956. Back in London, and now calling himself "Pete" rather than "Peter", he continued to be heard frequently on Radio Luxembourg for many years, introducing recorded sponsored programmes. He also presented popular music on the BBC Light Programme, particularly in the programme Pete Murray's Party from 1958 to 1961 and co-hosted one of BBC Television's earliest pop music programmes, the skiffle-based Six-Five Special (1957–1958); other regular presenters were Jo Douglas and Freddie Mills. He was a regular panellist on the same channel's Juke Box Jury (1959–1967). He was the "guest DJ" on several editions of ABC-TV's Thank Your Lucky Stars (1961–1966) and he later hosted Come Dancing. He was among the first regular presenters of Top of the Pops when it began in January 1964. In 1961, he co-starred with Dora Bryan in a TV sitcom about two newly weds entitled Happily Ever After.

During the early 1960s, Murray co-hosted the New Musical Express Poll Winners' Concert, annually held at Empire Pool, Wembley, with acts such as the Beatles, Cliff Richard and the Shadows, Joe Brown and the Bruvvers, the Who and many others. These were shown on television. In September 1968, he stood in for Alan Freeman on Pick of the Pops, while Freeman was in New York. Murray linked up with him for a look at the American pop scene during the two shows that he did.

Murray hosted the UK heat of the Eurovision Song Contest in 1959 and provided the British commentary for the contest itself on both radio and television in 1959 until 1961 and in 1968 and again in 1972 until 1973 for radio, and television commentary for the 1975 and 1977 contest. He was an occasional compère of variety shows at the London Palladium.

Murray was one of the original BBC Radio 1 disc-jockeys when the station started in 1967. By 1969, he was one of the mainstays of BBC Radio 2, where for over ten years he anchored the two-hour magazine show Open House five days a week, heard by 5.5 million listeners. One April Fools' Day he pretended that the show was being televised. In 1973 and 1976, he was voted BBC Radio Personality of the Year. In 1974, he was featured on the Emerson, Lake and Palmer live album 'Welcome Back, My Friends, to the Show That Never Ends ~ Ladies and Gentlemen' as the master of ceremonies, at the beginning of the album.

In 1980, Radio 2 moved Murray from weekday to weekend programming. In 1981, he began a move into more serious, speech-only radio with a stint as presenter of Midweek on BBC Radio 4. In 1984, he started afresh as a presenter for LBC, a local talk radio station in London. He later won the Variety Club of Great Britain award for his show. He introduced his last programme there on 22 December 2002 and has not broadcast regularly since. In August 2008 he returned as a presenter on an Internet-only station, UK Light Radio.

Murray also worked as an actor. He attended the Royal Academy of Dramatic Art and is a RADA Gold Medallist. On the London stage he starred in the musical Scapa! (1962). During the 1960s, he starred in the British sitcoms Happily Ever After (1961-64), opposite Dora Bryan,  and Mum's Boys (1968), opposite Bernard Bresslaw and Irene Handl. He had roles in several films including Caravan (1946), Hungry Hill (1947), My Brother Jonathan (1948), Portrait from Life (1948), Escort for Hire (1960), A Taste of Money (1960), Design for Loving (1962), The Cool Mikado (1962), Simon, Simon (1970) and Cool It Carol! (1970), and played Philippe in "My Friend the Inspector", a 1961 episode of BBC TV's Maigret. He appeared as himself in several productions including the 1962 British musical comedy It's Trad, Dad! alongside fellow BBC disc jockeys Alan Freeman and David Jacobs and in "The Writer", an episode of ATV's Hancock (1963).

Murray also appeared in pantomime, and guested on many radio and TV panel games. In 1984 and 1985, he was a team captain on the ITV panel game Vintage Quiz. In 2015, he appeared as a guest on a chat show on Big Centre TV hosted by his former radio colleague David Hamilton. Murray returned to radio to host a special show for Boom Radio on Boxing Day 2021. In 2022, he appeared in the Channel 5 documentary TOTP: Secrets & Scandals. He returned to Boom Radio on Boxing Day 2022 for another show, this time alongside his friend and former colleague David Hamilton.

Personal life
Murray married his first wife, Germain, in Luxembourg, in 1952, but they divorced. He was in a relationship with Valerie Singleton, before marrying Patricia Crabbe, a former barrister. He once broke down on live television after his son, Michael Murray James, who had been a pupil at Wycliffe College, also an actor, committed suicide at the age of 27, and afterwards he gave talks on coping with family tragedy.

He is a lifelong teetotaller. In 1983, he appeared as a guest newspaper reviewer on the BBC TV's early-morning magazine show Breakfast Time. During an outburst, he told viewers how to vote at the upcoming election, saying that "a vote for Labour is a vote for communism. May God have mercy on your soul if you don't vote Conservative". At the end of 1983, the BBC cancelled his radio shows, describing his style of broadcasting as too old-fashioned.

Publications
 (With Jeremy Hornsby) One Day I'll Forget My Trousers (autobiography), London, 1975.

References

External links

 Radio Rewind Profile

1925 births
Living people
Alumni of RADA
British radio personalities
British radio DJs
English radio presenters
People educated at St Paul's School, London
Conservative Party (UK) people
Male actors from London
Radio Luxembourg (English) presenters
BBC Radio 2 presenters
Officers of the Order of the British Empire
Top of the Pops presenters